Perth County is a county in the Canadian province of Ontario in Southwestern Ontario,  west of Toronto. Its population centres are Listowel, Mitchell and Milverton. The City of Stratford and the Town of St. Marys are within the Perth census division, but are separate from Perth County. The 2016 population of Perth County was 38,066.

Municipalities
The county comprises four lower-tier municipalities:
Municipality of North Perth, 2016 population 13,130 
Township of Perth East, 2016 population 12,261
Municipality of West Perth, 2016 population 8,865
Township of Perth South, 2016 population 3,810

History

Perth County was settled primarily through the efforts of the Canada Company agency which opened a road from the site of Stratford to Goderich. The settlers were almost equal in number as to their origins: English, Irish, Scottish and German. They began arriving in the 1820s but the majority arrived in the 1830s and the 1840s. Most became farmers, and even today, the county is known for mixed farming, dairying and hog production.

This area originally formed part of the Huron District, which was constituted as the United Counties of Huron, Perth and Bruce in 1850. The County of Perth was given its own Provisional Municipal Council at that time, and was separated from the United Counties in 1853.

It had 11 original townships. Eight of the townships were laid out as part of the Huron Tract, and three more were surveyed from that part of the crown land known as the Queen's Bush:

The City of Stratford was formed from parts of Downie, Ellice and Easthope Townships. In 1831 William Sergeant was given a lot by the Canada Company on the condition that he open an inn. In 1832 he erected the first frame building in the region by the Avon River and called it the "Shakespeare Hotel."  First purchaser of land was John Sharman (1834), a blacksmith from Bedfordshire, England. His son, Henry, was the first child born within the limits of the city.

Over time, four additional towns were incorporated as urban municipalities: St. Marys, Mitchell, Listowel and Milverton. On January 1, 1998, the county was restructured by reducing fourteen municipalities to four. The City of Stratford and the Town of St. Marys retained their status as separated municipalities.

Demographics

Government

Township council
Perth County Council is made up of representatives from the four member municipalities within the county's boundaries, not including Stratford or St. Marys which had 48.8% of the population in 2011. The head of County Council is elected from amongst the council members annually, in December, by a vote at council and is known as the Warden. In 2016–2017, the Perth County Warden (Head of County Council) is Meredith (Mert) Schneider. Each of theTownships also has a mayor and Council.

The full 2015-2018 Perth County Council consists of the following. Bob McMillan, Rhonda Ehgoetz and Helen Dowd from Perth East, Robert Wilhelm and James Aitcheson from Perth South, Walter McKenzie and Doug Eidt from West Perth, and three from North Perth, Julie Behrns, Doug Kellum and (already discussed) Meredith (Mert) Schneider.

Fully independent of County Council, but located within the County of Perth, Stratford is governed by an elected mayor and ten councilors. Also independent, the Town of St. Marys has its own mayor and six councilors.

Federal Government 
Perth—Wellington is a federal electoral district in Ontario, Canada, that has been represented in the House of Commons of Canada since 2004.  It was created in 2003 from parts of Dufferin—Peel—Wellington—Grey, Perth—Middlesex and Waterloo—Wellington ridings.

It consists of the County of Perth, the City of Stratford, the Town of St. Mary's and the Town of Minto and the townships of Mapleton and Wellington North in the County of Wellington.

Provincial Government 
Perth—Wellington is a provincial electoral district in Ontario, Canada, that has been represented in the Legislative Assembly of Ontario since the 2007 provincial election.  It was created in 2003 from parts of Dufferin—Peel—Wellington—Grey, Perth—Middlesex and Waterloo—Wellington ridings.

It consists of the County of Perth, and the Town of Minto and the townships of Mapleton and Wellington North in the County of Wellington.  Randy Pettapiece was elected MPP for the riding on October 6, 2011, and has been re-elected twice.

Recreational Facilities
According to County documents, the area (including Stratford and St. Marys) encompasses the following:

5 ice pads/arenas 
8 community centres
4 swimming pools
26 baseball diamonds
16 soccer pitches
50 km of hiking trails 
262 km of cycling trails
7 tennis courts
7 golf courses

Health Care 
Perth County has three hospitals, in Stratford, Listowel and St. Marys, with 24-hour emergency services. Large regional health care centres are located in London, Ontario and Kitchener-Waterloo, Ontario.

Listowel Hospital offers comprehensive care including a breast health centre and a Family Primary Care Centre. Stratford General Hospital offers many services, including MRI.

Perth County Paramedic Services has seven staffed ambulances; stations are located in Stratford, St. Marys, Listowel, Mitchell and Milverton. The Headquarters are in Stratford.

Police Services
The City of Stratford has its own Police Department. The Stratford Police Service also provides service to St. Marys with a police cruiser on patrol 24/7 and an additional officer stationed at Town Hall during business hours. Other areas of the county receive services from the Ontario Provincial Police, Perth County Detachment in Sebringville with satellite offices in Listowel, Mitchell and St. Marys

Education 

Perth County is served by the Avon Maitland District School Board and the Huron Perth Catholic District School Board. Private schools are also present: Listowel Christian School, Nancy Campbell Academy, Sunshine Montessori School, Stratford & District Christian School and Stratford Middle Years School.

Post-Secondary facilities include the Stratford Campuses of Conestoga College and the University of Waterloo as well as Stratford Chef's School.

Economy 
Perth County is an agricultural area; farm cash receipts for main commodities totaled $739 million in 2012. The county is home to 2,252 census farms and 506,291 acres of farmland, employing over 3,000 people (2012) in crop and animal production. Dairy farming is the primary category, with receipts of $210 million (2012) while pork production is second at $161 million. Food processing industries are also represented, with 20 such companies (2012).

Manufacturing, primarily in Stratford and Listowel, Ontario is also significant. Categories include auto parts, metal fabrication, plastic injection moulding, robotics, and building and construction as well as plastics and textile manufacturing.  Stratford has been attracting an increasing number of high-tech companies.

The largest employers in Perth County include
Maple Leaf Foods, Listowel Technology Inc., Spinrite Inc., Cooper Standard Automotive, Erie Meat Products Ltd., Parmalat, Armtech-Durisol, Ideal Supply Company Ltd., Taylor Construction and  FGC Construction.

Particularly in Stratford, tourism is a major part of the economy because of the Stratford Festival which runs from May to October each year. The full County has increased its efforts to boost tourism in the areas outside Stratford; it hired a full-time Tourism Coordinator in January 2017.

Transportation 
The area is serviced by the Stratford Municipal Airport which can handle air traffic ranging from Dash 8s to helicopters. It services over 12,000 yearly flights: freight, corporate and recreational. Larger airports are located in London, Ontario, Hamilton, Ontario and outside Toronto, Ontario. Passenger rail service is offered by VIA Rail with trains from Stratford to London, Toronto and Ottawa daily. Three carriers provide daily freight rail service.

Media

Newspapers 
 The Beacon Herald
 Independent Plus
 Listowel Banner
 Mitchell Advocate

Radio 
 CJCS-FM
 CHGK-FM
 CHLP-FM

See also
List of county courthouses in Ontario
List of municipalities in Ontario
List of townships in Ontario

References

Further reading

External links

 
Counties in Ontario
Southwestern Ontario